Jordan Klepper (born March 9, 1979) is an American comedian, writer, producer, political commentator, television host, and actor. He began his career as a member of The Second City and Upright Citizens Brigade. From 2014 to 2017, he was a correspondent on The Daily Show. He started his own satirical program, The Opposition with Jordan Klepper, which was canceled in 2018. He then starred in the 2019 docuseries, Klepper, before returning to The Daily Show later that year. He often appears on a segment entitled "Jordan Klepper Fingers the Pulse".

Early life
Jordan Klepper was born in Kalamazoo, Michigan, on March 9, 1979, the son of Betse, a secretary at Loy Norrix High School, and Mark Klepper. Betse and Mark were introduced to each other by Betse's cousin, the actor and comedian Tim Allen, who was Mark's roommate at Western Michigan University. Klepper attended Kalamazoo Central High School and Kalamazoo Area Mathematics and Science Center, where he was a tennis player and a member of the Mock Trial Team that won Nationals.

After graduating from high school, with a Frederick W. Heyl and Elsie L. Heyl Science Scholarship Fund full-tuition scholarship from Kalamazoo College, in 1997, Klepper double-majored in math and theater at Kalamazoo College and received his degree in 2001. He studied abroad in London during his time there. While at Kalamazoo College, his sister befriended aspiring actor Steven Yeun and took him to see Klepper's improv show, which inspired Yeun to attend his first acting class.

Career

After graduation, Klepper moved to Chicago, where he performed at The Second City. While there, he also worked for the Big Ten Network as a comedian on the show Big Ten Friday Night Tailgate. He moved to New York City in 2011, where he began performing as a member of the Upright Citizens Brigade.

Klepper debuted on The Daily Show on March 3, 2014, four days after his initial audition. He received consistently positive reviews for his segments on the show, and filled in as the host in October 2016 when Trevor Noah was sick.

In April 2017, Comedy Central announced that Klepper would host a new show in the fall, which would follow The Daily Show. A special titled Jordan Klepper Solves Guns premiered on Comedy Central on June 11, 2017. The new show was titled The Opposition with Jordan Klepper and premiered on September 25. The show was canceled in June 2018, with Klepper starting a new docuseries, Klepper, which aired in 2019. He returned to The Daily Show in December 2019. He also launched a podcast with former Ohio governor John Kasich called Kasich & Klepper.

Influences
Klepper has said that his comedy influences include Trevor Noah, Stephen Colbert, and Jon Stewart.

Personal life
Klepper married Laura Grey in 2013. The two met as members of  The Second City and Upright Citizens Brigade and later wrote, directed, produced, and starred in short films.

Filmography

Film

Television

Awards

References

External links
 

1979 births
Living people
21st-century American comedians
21st-century American male actors
21st-century American non-fiction writers
American atheists
American comedy writers
American male comedians
American male film actors
American male stage actors
American male television actors
American media critics
American political commentators
American satirists
American sketch comedians
American social commentators
American television talk show hosts
American television writers
Comedians from Michigan
Criticism of journalism
Kalamazoo College alumni
Late night television talk show hosts
Male actors from Michigan
American male television writers
Male feminists
People from Kalamazoo, Michigan
Upright Citizens Brigade Theater performers
Writers from Kalamazoo, Michigan
21st-century American male writers
Television producers from Michigan